Women's short distance cross-country free skiing events at the 2006 Winter Paralympics were contested at Pragelato on 12 March.

There were 3 events, of 5 km or 2.5 km distance. Standings were decided by applying a disability factor to the actual times achieved.

Results

5km Visually impaired
The visually impaired event was won by Verena Bentele, representing .

2.5km Sitting
The sitting event was won by Olena Iurkovska, representing .

5km Standing
The standing event was won by Katarzyna Rogowiec, representing .

References

W
Para